The Licentiate in Theology or (in Britain) Licence in Theology (LTh or, in Australia, ThL) is a non-degree qualification in theology awarded in Canada and previously awarded in the United Kingdom, Australia, and New Zealand.

A qualification similar to the LTh is the two-year postgraduate Licentiate of Sacred Theology (STL), available from pontifical universities.

United Kingdom
The Licence in Theology was one of two courses (the other being the Bachelor of Arts degree course) offered by  Durham University at its opening in 1833 and was first awarded in 1834. It required both the passing of an academic examination and a testimonial to the candidate's moral character. The course initially had a standard length of two years, reduced to one for graduates of Oxford and Cambridge (and, soon after, for Durham graduates); this was raised to three years for 1841–1846, but this led to a serious fall in numbers and it returned to two years from 1846. It ran in a variety of different forms, including being offered with honours for a period from 1864 to 1907 (when the honours course in theology leading to a BA was established). At the same time, the LTh was opened to students at Anglican theological colleges affiliated to Durham without the need for residence at the university (after passing the LTh they could take a BA following a year in residence at Durham and the passing of the required exams); from 1918, the LTh was only available to students at these affiliated colleges and was not offered at Durham. It was abolished in 1949.  The Common Awards validated by Durham and offered to all Church of England ordinands since 2014, as well as trainee ministers from the Methodist, Baptist and United Reformed churches, include a variety of degree and non-degree qualifications. However, these follow the naming conventions of the Framework for Higher Education Qualifications and do not include a licence in theology.

St David's College, Lampeter awarded a Licence in Divinity (LD) from 1884 to c. 1940. The  LTh, introduced in 1971, was intended for graduate ordinands, and was equivalent to the final year of a bachelor's degree. The course is still offered by the  University of Wales, Trinity Saint David, the successor institution of St David's College, but is now the Graduate Diploma in Bible and Theology in keeping with the Framework for Higher Education Qualifications.

St John's College, Nottingham, previously the London College of Divinity, replaced its Associate of the London College of Divinity diploma with a License in Theology diploma when it relocated to Nottingham in 1971. The college closed in 2019.

The University of Aberdeen offered a Licence in Theology until 2002, when it was withdrawn due to the Church of Scotland deciding to no longer recognise the degree.

Australia
The Australian College of Theology offered a Licentiate in Theology from its opening in 1891, originally as a qualification only for ordained clergy. Until the 1970s, most Australian theological colleges were not associated with universities and thus offered non-degree programmes such as the Licentiate in Theology.

New Zealand
In New Zealand the diploma of Licentiate in Theology was offered by St John's College, Auckland from 1951. The course was transferred to the Ecumenical Institute for Distance Theological Studies when it opened in 1993, where it was offered until the institute closed in 2015.

Canada
In Canada, Licentiates in Theology are offered by Huron University College, the College of Emmanuel and St. Chad, Trinity College, Toronto, and the Montreal Diocesan Theological College.

See also
Academic degree
Doctor of Sacred Theology

References

Religious degrees